Karijärvi is a medium-sized lake of Finland in the Kymijoki main catchment area. It is located in the municipality of Kouvola, in region of Kymenlaakso. In the north-eastern shore of the lake there is an area of Uutelanvuori rock paintings.

See also
List of lakes in Finland

References

Lakes of Kouvola
Lakes of Heinola